Judith Plá Roig (born 2 May 1978, in Barcelona) is a Spanish long-distance runner. At the 2012 Summer Olympics, she competed in the Women's 5000 metres, finishing 25th overall in Round 1, failing to qualify for the final.

Competition record

References

RFEA profile

1978 births
Living people
Spanish female long-distance runners
Olympic athletes of Spain
Athletes (track and field) at the 2012 Summer Olympics
Athletes from Barcelona
Competitors at the 2003 Summer Universiade
Athletes (track and field) at the 2001 Mediterranean Games
Athletes (track and field) at the 2009 Mediterranean Games
Mediterranean Games competitors for Spain